Your Home in Their Hands is a British makeover television show that aired on BBC One from 25 September 2014 to 22 February 2015.

The show sees four amateur interior designers decorate two desperate homes in a £15,000 makeover, with Celia Sawyer as the presenter.

Production
The television series was commissioned by Charlotte Moore and Mark Lindsay, and announced on 21 October 2013. Charlotte Moore said: "Your Home in Their Hands will see BBC One indulge viewers’ passion for home decoration, something we’ve not explored on the channel in recent years." Celia Sawyer, the judge for the series, said: "Anyone who comes on the show and thinks interior design is a walk in the park is going to have a real shock. Interior design isn't just about painting a wall pretty colours, it’s about listening to your brief and working hard to fulfill it. That's what I will be looking for." BBC Worldwide has invested in the series.

International broadcast
The series was first shown in Australia on 15 February 2015 on LifeStyle Home.

References

External links
 

2014 British television series debuts
2015 British television series endings
BBC Television shows
English-language television shows